Manuel Mozos (born June 1959, in Lisbon) is a Portuguese film director.

Biography 

Mozos studied history and philosophy before enrolling at the School of Theatre and Cinema, where he specialized as an editor. He was responsible for the editing of several films, and in 1989, he directed Um Passo, Outro Passo e Depois... In 1992, he directed his first feature, Xavier. Since then he has also directed several documentaries and video clips, including 4 Hearts, produced and released by Rosa Filmes.

Filmography
 2017 - Ramiro
 2009 - 4 Copas
 2009 - Ruínas
 2007 - Diana
 2000 - Crescei e Multiplicai-vos
 1999 - Censura: Alguns Cortes
 1999 - ...Quando Troveja
 1998 - José Cardoso Pires - Diário de Bordo
 1997 - Cinema Português?
 1996 - Solitarium
 1992 - Xavier
 1989 - Um Passo, Outro Passo e Depois...

References 

1959 births
Living people
Portuguese film directors
People from Lisbon
Lisbon Theatre and Film School alumni